Murchegan may refer to:
 Murchegan, Chaharmahal and Bakhtiari